The 2021–22 season was Ipswich Town's 144th year in their history and third consecutive season in League One. Along with the league, the club also competed in the FA Cup, the EFL Cup and the EFL Trophy. The season covered the period from 1 July 2021 to 30 June 2022.

Kits
Supplier: Adidas / Sponsor: Ed Sheeran (chest), Thank You NHS (back), Mortgagemove (shorts)

First-team squad

First-team coaching staff
Until 4 December:

From 16 December:

Pre-season friendlies
Ipswich Town announced they would play friendlies against Dartford, Bury Town, Stevenage, Crystal Palace, A double-header against Colchester United and Millwall as part of their pre-season preparations.

Competitions

League One

League table

Results summary

Results by matchday

Matches
Ipswich's fixtures were announced on 24 June 2021.

FA Cup

Ipswich Town were drawn at home to Oldham Athletic in the first round and Barrow in the second round.

EFL Cup

Ipswich Town were drawn at home to Newport County in the first round.

EFL Trophy

Ipswich were drawn into Group A of the Southern section alongside Colchester United, Gillingham and West Ham United U21s. On July 7, the fixtures for the group stage round was confirmed.

Transfers

Transfers in

Loans in

Loans out

Transfers out

New contracts

First-team

Academy

Squad statistics
All statistics updated as of end of season

Appearances and goals

|-
! colspan=14 style=background:#dcdcdc; text-align:center| Goalkeepers

|-
! colspan=14 style=background:#dcdcdc; text-align:center| Defenders

|-
! colspan=14 style=background:#dcdcdc; text-align:center| Midfielders

|-
! colspan=14 style=background:#dcdcdc; text-align:center| Forwards

|-
! colspan=14 style=background:#dcdcdc; text-align:center| Players transferred out during the season

|-

Goalscorers

Assists

Clean sheets

Disciplinary record

Captains

Awards

Player awards

EFL League One Goal of the Month

PFA Fans' League One Player of the Month

EFL League One Team of the Season

References

Ipswich Town
Ipswich Town F.C. seasons